Mimesis, released on April 23, 2008 on Spinefarm, is the second album by the Finnish alternative rock band End of You. You Deserve More is the only single. This album includes Goldeneye'''s cover by Tina Turner, from the soundtrack of GoldenEye.

Track listing
 "Better God" - 4:07
 "You Deserve More" - 3:15
 "Memoir" - 3:55
 "Goldeneye" (Tina Turner cover) - 4:10
 "Over and Out" - 4:27
 "Paper Trails" - 4:09
 "Blind Rhythm" - 4:42
 "Number 8" - 4:26
 "Driving Down the Void" - 3:27
 "In Elegance (Closure)" - 3:20

Singles
 You Deserve More (released on March 26, 2008)

Videos
 You Deserve More''

Credits 
 Jami Pietilä - vocals
 Jani Karppanen - guitar
 Timo Lehtinen - bass
 Joni Borodavkin - keyboards
 Mika Keijonen - drums

2008 albums